Croxley is a London Underground station located on Watford Road (A412) in Croxley Green, Rickmansworth, Hertfordshire, on the Watford branch of the Metropolitan line.

It is in Travelcard Zone 7.

History
However, this led to confusion as there was another Croxley Green opened by the LNWR in 1912, so it was renamed to "Croxley" in 1949. There had been shuttles running to and from Rickmansworth stations regularly but was withdrawn in January 1960, later reinstated in 1987 but only one in early morning and late evenings each way. The shuttles to Rickmansworth were later extended to Amersham following the introduction of the longer S8 Stock trains.

Metropolitan Line Extension
The Croxley Rail Link is a railway engineering project which would have resulted in the Watford branch services on the London Underground's Metropolitan line being diverted at Baldwins Lane from the current terminus at Watford tube station onto the alignment of the disused Watford and Rickmansworth Railway between Croxley Green railway station and Watford High Street stations before continuing to Watford Junction. The diversion would require the construction of a viaduct over the Grand Union Canal, River Gade and the A412.

On 25 January 2017, the Watford Observer newspaper published an update on the Croxley Rail Link confirming work had stopped as there was an ongoing funding issue.

References

External links

Metropolitan line stations
Tube stations in Hertfordshire
Former Metropolitan and Great Central Joint Railway stations
Railway stations in Great Britain opened in 1925
Croxley Rail Link
Charles Walter Clark railway stations